Korek may refer to:

 Korek, Greater Poland Voivodeship
 Mount Korek, Iraq
 Korek Airlines
 Korek Telecom
 Korek (surname)

pl:Korek